Damien Germanier (born 30 March 1988 in Sion) is a Swiss football midfielder, who currently plays for FC Echallens on loan from FC Sion.

Career
He began his career in the youth team of FC Sion and was promoted to the senior team in July 2007. In February 2009, he had a trial at FC La Chaux-de-Fonds, but later the loan deal was called off due to the player's military service.

On 14 March 2009, he made his debut for FC Sion in the Swiss Super League.

International
He was a member of the Swiss under-17 team at 2005 UEFA European Under-17 Football Championship.

Germanier is former U-18 national player from Switzerland

References

External links

Rot Weiss 24 Profile
Topsport Profile

1988 births
Living people
People from Sion, Switzerland
Swiss men's footballers
FC Sion players
Association football midfielders
Sportspeople from Valais